Sir Michael Friedlander  (born 1936) is a New Zealand businessman.

Friedlander is one of New Zealand's wealthiest people. In the 2010 Queen's Birthday Honours, he was appointed a Companion of the New Zealand Order of Merit, for community services. He was promoted to Knight Companion of the New Zealand Order of Merit, for services to philanthropy, in the 2016 Queen's Birthday Honours.

References

External links
Queen's Birthday Honours New Zealand

New Zealand Jews
Knights Companion of the New Zealand Order of Merit
1936 births
Living people
Businesspeople awarded knighthoods